Parmeh-ye Olya (also Romanized as Parmeh-ye ‘Olyā and Parmeh ‘Olyā; also known as Parmeh-ye Bālā) is a village in Chenarud-e Shomali Rural District, Chenarud District, Chadegan County, Isfahan Province, Iran. At the 2006 census, its population was 155, in 29 families.

References 

Populated places in Chadegan County